"Shining in the Light" is a song by Jimmy Page and Robert Plant from their 1998 studio album Walking into Clarksdale. Issued as the album's second single on 30 May 1998, the song reached No. 6 on the US Billboard Mainstream Rock chart.

The track contains an overdubbed string section performed by Page on the Mellotron. Added as a guide, the overdub was inadvertently left in for the album release.

Track listings

References 

1998 singles
1998 songs
Atlantic Records singles
Jimmy Page songs
Mercury Records singles
Robert Plant songs
Song recordings produced by Jimmy Page
Songs written by Jimmy Page
Songs written by Robert Plant